Meenathil Thalikettu is a 1998 Indian Malayalam-language comedy-drama film directed by Rajan Sankaradi and written by A. K. Sajan and A. K. Santhosh from a story by Lal Jose. It features Dileep, Thilakan, Zeenath and Jagathy Sreekumar in lead roles. The plot follows Omanakkuttan (Dileep), a 23-year-old who is still in high school who has to marry his friend's sister Malu under pressure. The music was composed by Ouseppachan. The film was remade in Kannada as Kanasina Loka (2004).

Plot

Omanakkuttan is twenty-three years old and still in high school, a fact which angers his father, Govindan. His life takes a turn when he goes for his friend Sudhi's sister's marriage. Due to certain circumstances, he has to marry Malathi, Sudhi's sister. This angers his father, however he allows them to stay in his home. Malu becomes pregnant and both Omanakkuttan and Malu are thrown out of the house since Omanakkuttan doesn't agree to an abortion according to his father's wish.

Cast
Dileep as Omanakkuttan/Omana
Tejali Ghanekar as Malathi/Malu Omanakuttan's wife
Thilakan as Govindan Nambeesan Omanakuttan father
Jagathi Sreekumar as Kaimal
Zeenath as Sharada
Baby Ambili as Ammini,  Omanakkuttan's sister
Janardanan as Kunjiraman
Kalabhavan Mani as Ochuuttee
Krishna Prasad as Sudhi
Adoor Bhawani as Kaimal's grandmother
Yadu Krishnan as Omanakkuttan's friend
Jose Prakash as Company manager
Vijay Menon as Rozario
Thesni Khan as Nancy
Oduvil Unnikrishnan as Doctor
Sukumari as Durga
Sankaradi as Durga's husband
Santhakumari as Malathi's mother
Elias Babu as Bridegroom's father
Meena Ganesh as Janu
Omana Ouseph
Nandu Poduval as Raghu, flower seller

Soundtrack 
The film's soundtrack contains 8 songs, all composed by Ouseppachan, with lyrics by Gireesh Puthenchery.

References

External links
 
 https://archive.today/20130218013408/http://popcorn.oneindia.in/title/6326/meenathil-thalikettu.html

1990s Malayalam-language films
1998 romantic drama films
Films scored by Ouseppachan
Indian teen romance films
1998 films
Indian romantic drama films
1990s teen romance films
Malayalam films remade in other languages
Films directed by Rajan Sankaradi